Universal was an Australian-based boy band, from the 1990s. They released three singles on London Records with "Rock Me Good" and "Make It with You" both entering the Top 40 of the UK Singles Chart in 1997. When the third single failed to make in impact, the band dissolved.

The Brothership

However, they reformed in 2005 in their hometown of Sydney, under the name 'The Brothership', and made it into the group final of the first ever The X-Factor finals, where they were mentored by Mark Holden. Holden won with another of his mentored groups called Random.

Band members
 George Philippou
 Michael Philippou
 Adam Philippou

Singles
 "Rock Me Good"
 "Make It with You"
 "Kill the Pain"

References

Australian boy bands
Australian musical trios
London Records artists
Musical groups established in the 1990s